The Combat Terrorist Organization was a short-lived Russian neo-Nazi gang active from 9 August 2003 to 2006. It was formed in Saint Petersburg by two members of the Mad Crowd skinhead group, namely, Dmitry Borovikov and Alexey Voyevodin.

The gang used exceptional secrecy to hide their activities. In contrast to other neo-fascist groups, there were no skinheads among its members. The group also used exclusively confidential mobile phones to communicate. Authorities also discovered that they met very rarely in the open and avoided talking about ideology or tactics near power sockets, preferring to write their words on paper.

On June 14, 2011, the trial of eight members of the group began, with member Pavel Rumyantsev tried separately.

Ideology 
The gang's main symbol was the swastika. By means of murder and terrorism, Dmitry Borovikov waged a campaign "to clear" St. Petersburg ("Nevograd") of non-white races such as Black, Armenoid, and Asians, who "fuck Russian women" and "by that profane race, give birth to bastards." His dream was allegedly to overthrow "the Jewish Russian Federation" and turn it into a monoethnic "Nordic Russia." The group sharply criticised Christianity while promoting neo-pagan ideology as an alternative. The group also introduced a propaganda that focused on the value of a healthy lifestyle and refusal of alcohol and drugs. Most members of the group were convinced hardline straight edgers. The group issued fanzines with titles such as  Kill or To Be Killed, Straight Edge - Шторм Чистой Крови, Гнев Перуна, Smell of Hatred.

Weapons 
The main weapons used by the gang were knives, crossbows, and guns, such as rifles (including Mosin rifles) and pump-action shotguns

Voyevodin, one of the gang's leaders, inherited two apartments when his mother and grandmother died. He sold one and used the money to buy a car, 4 Saiga carbines, and radio sets to listen to police radio.

Attacks 
 Armenian citizens Makvela Elamiryana and Liana Tumanyan on August 9, 2003, at the Nikolskoye settlement.
 Nigerian citizen Omordion Lavrense on October 2, 2003 at Tankista Khrustitskogo Street.
 A citizen from Georgia at Bolshaya Monetnaya Street and a Pakistani citizen on Leo Tolstoy Street on November 11, 2003.

Murders

Sentences

See also 

 NS/WP Crew
 The Savior (paramilitary organization)
 National Socialist Society
 Primorsky Partisans

References

2003 establishments in Russia
2006 disestablishments in Russia
Anti-Armenianism in Europe
Anti-Asian sentiment in Russia
Anti-black racism
Anti-Caucasus sentiment in Russia
Anti–Central Asian sentiment in Russia
Gangs in Russia
History of Saint Petersburg
Male serial killers
Neo-fascist terrorism
Neo-Nazi organizations
Neo-Nazism in Russia
Organizations disestablished in 2006
Organizations established in 2003
Russian nationalist organizations
Terrorism in Russia
Russian nationalism
Russian serial killers